is a railway station in the town of Ōishida, Yamagata, Japan, operated by East Japan Railway Company (JR East).

Lines
Kita-Ōishida Station is served by the Ōu Main Line, and is located 130.8 rail kilometers from the terminus of the line at Fukushima Station.

Station layout
The station has one side platform serving a single bi-directional track. The station is unattended.

History
Kita-Ōishida Station opened on December 20, 1960. The station was absorbed into the JR East network upon the privatization of JNR on April 1, 1987. A portion of the platform measuring 15 x 3 meters collapsed during the 2011 Tōhoku earthquake.

Surrounding area
Ōishida Elementary School

See also
List of railway stations in Japan

References

External links

 JR East Station information 

Railway stations in Yamagata Prefecture
Ōu Main Line
Stations of East Japan Railway Company
Railway stations in Japan opened in 1960
Ōishida, Yamagata